Cedric Tillman may refer to:

 Cedric Tillman (Arizona Rattlers) (born 1970), American football player
 Cedric Tillman (Denver Broncos) (born 1970), American football player
 Cedric Tillman (American football, born 2000), American football player